Ulva elegans is a species of seaweed in the family Ulvaceae that is endemic to Morocco.

Name
The name of the species comes from Latin meaning elegant.

References

Ulvaceae
Plants described in 1956
Endemic flora of Morocco
Flora of Africa